St. Marys is a city in Pottawatomie and Wabaunsee counties in the U.S. state of Kansas in the United States.  As of the 2020 census, the population of the city was 2,759.  It is home of Saint Mary's Academy and College.

History

St. Marys was laid out as a community in 1866. It was named after the St. Mary's Mission.

The oldest surviving mission building is the Pottawatomie Indian Pay Station which was built in 1855 and was used by government agents to pay an annuity to the Pottawatomie Indians who relocated to the area from the Great Lakes region. It was added to the National Register of Historic Places in 1972.

Starting in the 1980s, Traditionalist Catholics attending masses offered by Society of Saint Pius X began moving to St. Marys, attracted by the presence of the Society in the community as well as the relative isolation of the city from the modern world. Since then the number of residents in St. Marys affiliated with the SSPX has grown considerably, to the point where in 2020 that they formed the majority of the city's population. The growth of the SSPX has been a source of tension with some older residents who are not members of the movement and who do not share the society's conservative social values.

Geography
St. Marys is located at  (39.196273, -96.068672), on the Smoky Hill Trail and the Military Trail.

The city is located approximately 20 miles west of Topeka on U.S. Route 24.

Demographics

It is part of the Manhattan, Kansas Metropolitan Statistical Area.  It is known for its sizeable Catholic population.

2010 census
At the 2010 census there were 2,627 people, 836 households, and 560 families living in the city. The racial makeup of the city was 91.1% White, 1.1% African American, 1.4% Native American, 0.5% Asian, 2.3% from other races, and 3.6% from two or more races. Hispanic or Latino of any race were 9.0%.

Of the 836 households 37.6% had children under the age of 18 living with them, 54.4% were married couples living together, 9.0% had a female householder with no husband present, 3.6% had a male householder with no wife present, and 33.0% were non-families. 29.5% of households were one person and 14.7% were one person aged 65 or older. The average household size was 3.10 and the average family size was 4.04.

The median age was 26.8 years. 38.5% of residents were under the age of 18; 9.6% were between the ages of 18 and 24; 19.8% were from 25 to 44; 18.7% were from 45 to 64; and 13.6% were 65 or older. The gender makeup of the city was 48.0% male and 52.0% female.

2000 census
At the 2000 census there were 2,198 people, 818 total households, and 525 families living in the city. The racial makeup of the city was 95.18% White, 0.91% African American, 1.36% Native American, 0.50% Asian, 0.50% from other races, and 1.55% from two or more races. Hispanic or Latino of any race were 4.14%.

Of the 818 households 35.5% had children under the age of 18 living with them, 56.8% were married couples living together, 9.2% had a female householder with no husband present, and 31.2% were non-families. 29.7% of households were one person and 12.4% were one person aged 65 or older. The average household size was 2.83 and the average family size was 3.61.

The age distribution was 35.4% under the age of 18, 7.6% from 18 to 24, 24.0% from 25 to 44, 17.9% from 45 to 64, and 15.0% 65 or older. The median age was 31 years. For every 100 females, there were 91.3 males. For every 100 females age 18 and over, there were 88.4 males.

The median household income was $28,083 and the median family income  was $28,063. Males had a median income of $25,595 versus $23,750 for females. The per capita income for the city was $15,536. About 26.2% of families and 31.1% of the population were below the poverty line, including 17.1% of those under age 18 and 27.2% of those age 65 or over.

Religion 
There are two parishes in St. Marys, both of which are Catholic: the first is the Immaculate Conception Church, which is under the jurisdiction of the Roman Catholic Archdiocese of Kansas City; the second is the Assumption Chapel in St. Mary's Academy and College, which is under the jurisdiction of the Society of Saint Pius X (SSPX), a traditionalist Catholic association which is not in full communion with the Holy See.

According to the 2020 census, the majority of St. Marys's inhabitants are traditionalist Catholics affiliated to the SSPX; this has created tensions with some older residents who are not members of the movement and who do not share the society's conservative social values. Tensions also exist between the SSPX-affiliated traditionalist Catholic community and the regular Roman Catholic parish of the town.

The SSPX is planning to build a church in St. Marys, which will include 1,500 pews and is to be named the Immaculata.

Education
The community is served by Kaw Valley USD 321 public school district, which is located in St. Marys.  Besides providing education from pre-K to 12 in St. Marys, it also services students in a four-county radius with four other attendance centers.  Its high school is St. Marys High School.

A private school, St. Mary's Academy and College includes grades K-12 as well as a four-year college program. The Society of Saint Pius X operates the school.

References

Further reading

External links

 City of Saint Marys
 Saint Marys - Directory of Public Officials
 Saint Marys city map, KDOT

Cities in Kansas
Cities in Pottawatomie County, Kansas
Cities in Wabaunsee County, Kansas
Manhattan, Kansas metropolitan area
1869 establishments in Kansas
Populated places established in 1869
Society of Saint Pius X